Astigalidae is an extinct family of mammals related to the rodents and lagomorphs. Members of the family are known from the Paleocene and Eocene of China.

Genera 
 Astigale
 Yupingale
 Zhujegale

References 

Euarchontoglires
Prehistoric mammal families
Paleocene first appearances
Eocene extinctions